Gautama Siddha, (fl. 8th century) astronomer, astrologer and compiler of Indian descent, known for leading the compilation of the Treatise on Astrology of the Kaiyuan Era during the Tang Dynasty. He was born in Chang'an, and his family was originally from India, according to a tomb stele uncovered in 1977 in Xi'an. The Gautama family had probably settled in China over many generations, and might have been present in China prior even to the foundation of the Tang Dynasty. He was most notable for his translation of Navagraha calendar into Chinese. He also introduced Indian numerals with zero (〇) in 718 in China as a replacement of counting rods.

References

Footnotes

8th-century births
8th-century deaths
Chinese astrologers
Chinese people of Indian descent
8th-century Chinese astronomers
Indian astrologers
Writers from Xi'an
Tang dynasty writers
Scientists from Shaanxi
8th-century astrologers
Medieval Indian astrologers
8th-century Indian astronomers
8th-century Indian writers
8th-century Chinese translators